Garuda Shield is a two-week joint-exercise between the United States Army and Indonesian Army. The purposes of this joint-exercise is to enhance and enrich the jungle warfare ability of both U.S. Army and Indonesian Army. This joint-exercise took place in Indonesia. This joint-exercise was first held in 2007.

Garuda Shield 2009

This was the third year for the Garuda Shield joint-exercise. This joint-exercise took place in Bandung, West Java, Indonesia. It is a continuation of ongoing joint efforts co sponsored by the U.S. military (USPACOM) and Indonesian Army to provide assistance and training to the Indonesian military, support U.S. and Indonesian security objectives, and provide certification for Indonesian instructors on all levels of the Global Peacekeeping Operation Initiative. Several other nations were invited to join the exercise. The following nations were

Garuda Shield 2010

Garuda Shield 2010 was held in June 2010 in Cipatat, Bandung, Indonesia. As part of the exercise, staff officers from the Pacific Command, the HIARNG, USARPAC, and the TNI will form a brigade to test peace support and stability operations capabilities. As part of the exercise, staff officers from the Pacific Command, the HIARNG, USARPAC, and the TNI will form a brigade to test peace support and stability operations capabilities. Other troops are in the middle of conducting a field training exercise to exchange UN standardized organizational tactics, techniques and procedures to improve tactical interoperability. Meanwhile, engineers are working in Indonesia's rural communities to provide humanitarian civic actions (HCA). Every day scores of children mil about the construction sites to watch the progress. Engineer partners are making quick work of a baby clinic, community center and amphitheatre. Countries that were represented are

Garuda Shield 2011

Garuda Shield 2011 exercise has three main components: a command post exercise (CPX), a field training exercise (FTX), and a humanitarian civic action project. The 12-day training, which was attended by 631 TNI AD personnel and 141 personnel from USARPAC, aims to improve interoperability among trainees and prepare capacity building facilities for UN troop-sending countries. Director of Training of the Indonesian Army Doctrine, Education and Training Development Command (Kodiklat TNI-AD) Brig. Gen. Mulyono said the joint military exercise between the two countries was conducted to place the cooperation in the United Nations peace-keeping operation on a solid footing. He said the regular annual exercise this year in Bogor involved Indonesian Ground Force and United States Army Pacific (USARPAC), an Army Service Component Command (ASCC) of the United States Army and is the army component unit of the United States Pacific Command.

"Such an exercise is the fifth of its kind because Indonesia is frequently involved in UN peace-keeping missions," Mulyono said.

He added that the "Garuda Shield" exercise in general was intended to step up the relations between the two countries` ground forces.

"The joint exercise with the US is of great advantage in the face of peace-keeping operation dynamics, and the way how to integrate the system of training in Indonesia and the United States," Mulyono said. According to him, the exercise that will last until June 22 is divided into two stages, namely post command rehearsal (Geladi Posko) and field rehearsal (Geladi Lapang).

Garuda Shield 2012
To improve capabilities and skills, the Indonesian Army (TNI AD) conducted a joint exercise with the United States Army military in the Asia Pacific (USARPAC) at the 2nd Kostrad Infantry Division complex field, Singosari, Malang, East Java, Monday (11/6/2012).

The joint exercise, said Lieutenant General TNI M Munir, involved 456 Indonesian Army personnel and 104 USARPAC personnel. The activities that will be carried out include the command post exercise (CPX) which will be held at the Rindam Brawijaya PLDC and the field training exercise (FTX) which will be held in the training area in Rindam V Brawijaya Sidodadi Lawang, Malang, and Karya Bhakti (ENCAP) which will be held in Purwosari, Pasuruan.

Super Garuda Shield 2022
In April 2022, a new Garuda Shield joint-exercise was announced, which involved 14 countries, making it the largest edition of Garuda Shield by participants since it was established in 2009. The exercise, which was known as Super Garuda Shield, included Indonesia, Japan, the United States, Canada, South Korea, Australia, and the UK, while France, Germany, and India sent observers. Super Garuda Shield began on August 3 and ended on August 14, 2022. The joint-exercise was primarily composed of 2,000 American and 2,000 Indonesian troops, in addition to smaller forces from the other nations.

References

Indonesian Army
United States Army exercises